Kenya competed at the 2020 Summer Olympics in Tokyo. Originally scheduled to take place from 24 July to 9 August 2020, the Games were postponed to 23 July to 8 August 2021, because of the COVID-19 pandemic. It was the nation's fifteenth appearance at the Summer Olympics since its debut in 1956, having boycotted the 1976 Montreal and 1980 Moscow Games.

Kenya's medal tally was slightly down from 6 gold and 13 total medals in 2016, but it still won far more medals than any other African nation.

Medalists

Competitors
The following is the list of number of competitors in the Games.

Athletics

Kenyan athletes further achieved the entry standards, either by qualifying time or by world ranking, in the following track and field events (up to a maximum of 3 athletes in each event):

Six marathon runners (three per gender) were named to the Kenyan team on January 31, 2020, with defending champions Eliud Kipchoge and Vivian Cheruiyot racing at their fourth and fifth Olympics, respectively. The rest of the track and field team was officially announced on June 19, 2021, including Rio 2016 medalists Hellen Obiri (women's 10000 m), Julius Yego (men's javelin throw), and the reigning middle-distance champion Faith Kipyegon.

Track & road events
Men

Women

Field events

Boxing

Kenya entered four boxers (two per gender) into the Olympic tournament. Rio 2016 Olympian Nick Okoth (men's featherweight) and rookie Christine Ongare (women's flyweight) secured places in their respective weight divisions, with the former advancing to the final match and the latter scoring a box-off victory at the 2020 African Qualification Tournament in Diamniadio, Senegal. Elly Ajowi Ochola (men's heavyweight) and Elizabeth Akinyi (women's welterweight) completed the nation's boxing lineup by topping the list of eligible boxers from Africa in their respective weight divisions of the IOC's Boxing Task Force Rankings.

Rugby sevens

Summary

Men's tournament

Kenya national rugby sevens team qualified for the Games by securing a lone outright berth with a gold-medal victory at the 2019 Africa Men's Sevens in Johannesburg, South Africa.

Team roster

Group play

Women's tournament

Kenya women's national rugby sevens team qualified for the Games by winning the silver medal and securing a lone outright berth at the 2019 Africa Women's Sevens in Jemmal, Tunisia, as the winners South Africa decided not to accept the berth under SASCOC's rules pertaining to continental qualification route.

Team roster

Group play

Swimming

Kenya received a universality invitation from FINA to send two top-ranked swimmers (one per gender) in their respective individual events to the Olympics, based on the FINA Points System of June 28, 2021.

Taekwondo

Kenya entered one athlete into the taekwondo competition at the Games for the first time since Beijing 2008. Faith Ogallo secured a spot in the women's heavyweight category (+67 kg) with a top two finish at the 2020 African Qualification Tournament in Rabat, Morocco.

Volleyball

Beach
Kenya women's beach volleyball team qualified directly for the Olympics by winning the gold medal at the 2018–2020 CAVB Continental Cup Final in Agadir, Morocco.

Indoor
Summary

Women's tournament

Kenya women's volleyball team qualified for the Olympics by winning the pool round with three match points and securing an outright berth at the African Olympic Qualification Tournament in Yaoundé, Cameroon, marking the nation's recurrence to the sport for the first time since Athens 2004. 

Team roster

Group play

References

Nations at the 2020 Summer Olympics
2020
Kenya